Seven ships of the Royal Navy have been named HMS Juno after the Roman goddess Juno:

 was a 32-gun fifth rate launched in 1757.  She was burnt at Rhode Island in 1778 to prevent her capture.
 was a 32-gun  fifth rate launched in 1780 and broken up in 1811.
 was a 26-gun sixth rate launched in 1844. She was renamed HMS Mariner in 1878, and became a training ship named HMS Atalanta later that year. She foundered in the Atlantic in 1880.
 was a wooden screw corvette launched in 1867 and sold in 1887.
 was an  protected cruiser launched in 1895 and sold in 1920.
 was a J-class destroyer launched in 1938 and sunk in an air attack off Crete in 1941.
 was a  launched in 1965 and scrapped in 1994.

See also

References

Royal Navy ship names